Sir Charles William Mackay Price (22 November 1872 – 6 July 1954) was a Welsh politician, Conservative MP for Pembrokeshire from 1924–1929.  He defeated Gwilym Lloyd-George in the 1924 election but lost to Lloyd-George in 1929.  He was knighted in 1932. He served during the First World War with the Queen's Royal Regiment, reaching rank of Major.

He served in World War I as a Captain in the 7th Batt Royal West Surrey Regt and as a Major in the 11th Batt Royal West Surrey Regt went to France in July 1915.

He was also Deputy Lieutenant of Pembrokeshire.

References

External links 
 

1872 births
1954 deaths
Knights Bachelor
Queen's Royal Regiment officers
British Army personnel of World War I
Conservative Party (UK) MPs for Welsh constituencies
UK MPs 1924–1929
Deputy Lieutenants of Pembrokeshire
Members of the Parliament of the United Kingdom for Pembrokeshire